Aleem Dar PP (Punjabi, ; born 6 June 1968) is a Pakistani cricket umpire and former cricketer. He is a member of the Elite Panel of ICC Umpires. He won the David Shepherd Trophy three years in a row from 2009 to 2011, after being nominated twice in 2005 and 2006. Aleem Dar, Marais Erasmus, Richard Kettleborough, Kumar Dharmasena and Simon Taufel were the only umpires to have received the award from its inception until 2017. Before becoming an umpire, he played first-class cricket as a right-handed batsman and a leg-break bowler for Allied Bank, Gujranwala, Lahore and Pakistan Railways.

In December 2019, in the first match between Australia and New Zealand, Aleem stood in his 129th Test match, breaking the record previously set by Steve Bucknor. On 1 November 2020, in the second ODI between Pakistan and Zimbabwe, Aleem stood in his 210th ODI match as an on-field umpire, surpassing South African Rudi Koertzen's record of officiating in the most ODI matches. 

Aleem Dar salary: https://frcric1.blogspot.com/2023/03/who-is-aleem-dar-umpire-and-retirement.html

Personal life 
Aleem Dar was born on June 6, 1968, in Jhang, Pakistan. He is married to Noshaba and has three children, two sons Hassan and Ali, and late daughter Jaweria, who died due to epilepsy.

Career

Umpiring 
Aleem is best known as an international cricket umpire. He made his international umpiring debut in an ODI between Pakistan and Sri Lanka at Gujranwala on 16 February 2000. In 2002 he became a member of ICC's International Panel of umpires. He was chosen to umpire at the ICC Cricket World Cup.

In April 2004, he became the first Pakistani to be part of the Elite Panel of ICC Umpires. He was nominated for the ICC Umpire of the year Award in 2005 and 2006, beaten on both occasions by the Australian Simon Taufel. On 17 October 2007 Aleem umpired in his 100th ODI (between India and Australia at Mumbai), making him the tenth umpire in the history of cricket to reach that landmark. He reached the landmark in a record time, taking just seven years, and became the first Pakistani to officiate in a century of One Day Internationals.

Aleem has stood in a solitary India-Pakistan ODI match at Karachi 2006 and five Ashes Test matches. He was also one of the on-field umpires for the final of the 2006 ICC Champions Trophy, standing alongside Rudi Koertzen. He was appointed to stand in the final of the 2007 Cricket World Cup between Australia and Sri Lanka, where he officiated with Steve Bucknor. Dar was also selected to stand in the final of the 2010 ICC World Twenty20 between Australia and England .

In January 2005, Aleem and his colleague Steve Bucknor, received death threats during a Test match between England and South Africa at Centurion. He was also involved in a controversy during the 2007 Cricket World Cup final where he, along with fellow officials Bucknor, Koertzen, Bowden and Crowe incorrectly made Australia bowl three unnecessary overs in near darkness. Consequently, the ICC decided to suspend him, along with the other four officials, from duty for the next ICC event, which was the 2007 World Twenty20 Championship.

Aleem proved his accuracy at the 2011 Cricket World Cup when all the 15 Umpire Decision Review System appeals against him were struck down.

He was selected as one of the twenty umpires to stand in matches during the 2015 Cricket World Cup. In April 2019, he was named as one of the sixteen umpires to stand in matches during the 2019 Cricket World Cup. The following month, in the second match of the 2019 Ireland Tri-Nation Series, he became the third umpire, and first from Pakistan, to officiate in 200 ODIs.

On 16 March 2023, Dar retired from the elite panel of umpires after a 19 year career. He will still umpire games if the PCB selects him to stand in games played in Pakistan.

Aleem Dar Cricket Academy 
Aleem Dar Cricket Academy, ADCA is training and coaching academy for hearing-impaired boys and girls. It is located in Lahore, Pakistan. It is equipped with a ground, gymnasium, jogging track and basketball court. Aleem Dar formed it in 2013.

Dar's Delighto 
In 2018, he started a restaurant named Dar's Delighto in PIA Cooperative Housing Society, Lahore.

Accolades
After being nominated twice in 2005 and 2006, Aleem finally won the Umpire of the Year award in October 2009, at the annual ICC awards ceremony in Johannesburg, South Africa. By claiming the award, Aleem ended Simon Taufel's run of five successive awards. It was the first time that any umpire other than Taufel had picked up the accolade in the six years that the ceremony has taken place. In October 2010, he won the award for a second straight year. In September 2011, he was named best umpire for the third consecutive year. On 14 August 2010, the Government of Pakistan honoured him with the President's Award for Pride of Performance.

He was honoured by ICC for officiating in 150 ODIs.

See also 
 List of Test cricket umpires
 List of One Day International cricket umpires
 List of Twenty20 International cricket umpires

References

External links
 

1968 births
Living people
Allied Bank Limited cricketers
Pakistani people of Kashmiri descent
Pakistani Test cricket umpires
Pakistani One Day International cricket umpires
Pakistani Twenty20 International cricket umpires
Punjabi people
Recipients of the Pride of Performance
Lahore City cricketers
Gujranwala cricketers
Pakistan Railways cricketers
Recipients of Sitara-i-Imtiaz
Government Islamia College alumni
Pakistani Muslims
20th-century Pakistani people
21st-century Pakistani people